The Singapore Mint was founded in 1968, after the independence of Singapore from Malaysia. Currently, Singapore Mint is contracted by the Monetary Authority of Singapore (MAS) to mint their coins. 

The Singapore Mint sells various coins, Singapore themed gifts as well as Singapore souvenirs. For coin collectors, they also sell foreign coins to save the hassle of shipping in from other countries. The Singapore Mint also runs a Singapore Coins and Notes Museum, with admission fees of $10 for adults and $6 for students, NSF (servicemen) and senior citizens. The coin gallery is closed. The mint collected S$5 million in 2009 when it organised a coin-note exchange, twice the amount of previous years, possibly due to the economic downturn.

The Singapore Mint has 4 retail stores.

See also
List of mints
Singapore Portrait Series currency notes
Monetary Authority of Singapore

References

External links

Mints (currency)
Manufacturing companies of Singapore
Government-owned companies of Singapore
Bullion dealers
Singaporean companies established in 1968